Euxoa nomas is a species of moth of the family Noctuidae described by Nikolay Grigoryevich Erschoff in 1874. It is found in Iran and Turkestan, as well as Alaska and Canada.

Between 1987 and 2010, the populations of this species were considered to be two separate subspecies, Euxoa nomas nomas in Asia and Euxoa nomas incognita in North America.

Notes and references

Euxoa
Moths of Asia
Moths of North America
Moths described in 1874